Kat Cressida is an American actress whose credits include voicing the character Dee Dee on the animated television series Dexter's Laboratory, as well as playing the Bride in The Haunted Mansion at the Disneyland Resort and Walt Disney World Resort. She also voiced Bloody Mary in the video game The Wolf Among Us.

Early career
Cressida guest-starred in several television shows and theatre productions, such as Loco Motives and made her feature film debut in The Long Way Home, before starting her voice acting career in 2000.

Voice acting
Cressida has voiced Jessie from Toy Story in various Disney projects, serving as a voice double for Joan Cusack. She is best known for voicing Dee Dee in seasons 2 and 4 of the Cartoon Network series Dexter's Laboratory, Uta in the F/X series Archer and the Bride in Disneyland and Disney World's The Haunted Mansion theme parks. She is also noted for being the first woman to do live announcing for ESPN's coverage of the 2010 NFL Draft, as well as announcing for several other shows for ESPN, NBC Sports and Versus. She can also be heard in other attractions throughout the Disney Parks, including The Twilight Zone Tower of Terror, Toy Story Midway Mania! and Epcot Character Spot. She was the first voice actress to narrate for WatchMojo.com and has also made appearances in video games, including Marvel Heroes, Guild Wars 2, Fallout 4, Mirror's Edge, Master of Orion, The Elder Scrolls, Star Trek Online, EverQuest, Titan Quest, Dragon Age and World of Warcraft, among others. She is represented by Cool Water Productions and Talent for Cons, a booking agent for fan conventions such as the San Diego Comic-Con.

Public speaking
Cressida is also a public speaker. She shared her story about being diagnosed with Dermatofibrosarcoma protuberans in 2012 and the subsequent two years of life-threatening surgeries and specialized treatment she went through in order to re-learn how to speak so she could continue her career. She has since spoken to audiences who are amidst their own recoveries from cancer, healing from PTSD and overcoming speech disabilities.

Education
Cressida graduated from the University of California, Berkeley.

Filmography

Animation
 Archer – Uta
 Dexter's Laboratory – Dee Dee (seasons 2, 4)
 Jackie Chan Adventures – Portia, Various
 Phineas and Ferb – Additional Voices
 The Powerpuff Girls – Additional voices

Anime
 Initial D – Natsuki "Natalie" Mogi (English dub)
 Tales from Earthsea – Additional Voices
 The Cat Returns – Additional Voices

Film
 Dexter's Laboratory: Ego Trip – Dee Dee
 Khumba – Cheerleader Zebra #2
 Piper Penguin and his Fantastic Flying Machines – Penny
 Tarzan – Kala (Gorilla Vocal Effects)
 Tinker Bell – Mrs. Darling
 Whispers: An Elephant's Tale – Princess

Live-action
 Babylon 5 – Kat the Bartender
 Diagnosis: Murder – Iris, Production Coordinator, Louisa Romero
 Judging Amy – Additional Voices
 M.A.N.T.I.S. – Brenda 
 Murder, She Wrote – Darlene Farber
 The Long Way Home – Herself
 VH1 Goes Inside – Herself

Video games
 Batman: Arkham Knight – Additional Voices
 Buffy the Vampire Slayer: Chaos Bleeds – Additional Voices
 Cartoon Network Racing – Dee Dee
 Dark Deception – Agatha, The Matron 
 Disney Infinity series – Jessie
 Epic Seven - Yufine, Charlotte, Kluri
 EverQuest II – Slaver Brona, Mirini, Tullo Domna, Irian, Zatzy, Thayare Faystrider, Innurae V'Tarris, Nashii, Eireneith Alannia, Luvile Binlee, Soly Gatherall, Doralis Covecrasher, Generic Female Troll Merchant, Generic Female Dark Elf Merchant, Generic Female Dwarf Merchant, Generic Female Froglok Merchant, Generic Female Ratonga Merchant, Generic Female Troll Merchant, Generic Female Barbarian Merchant, Generic Female Barbarian Enemy, Generic Female High Elf Enemy
 Fallout 4 – Scribe Neriah, Geneva
 Fallout 76: Wastelanders - Blood Eagles
 Fantastic Four – Additional Voices
 Kinect: Disneyland Adventures – Constance Hatchaway
 Madagascar – Little Girl, Woman, Lemur, Mom
 Marvel Heroes – Elektra
 Marvel Ultimate Alliance 3: The Black Order – Elektra
 Master of Orion: Conquer the Stars – Mrrshan Empress
 Quake 4 – Computer, Pilot VO
 Rage 2 – Eden AI, MBTV Worker, Vineland Wallrat
 Ratchet & Clank Future: A Crack in Time – Cassiopeia
 Shark Tale – Additional Voices
 Skylanders: SuperChargers – Scratch
 Skylanders: Swap Force – Scratch
 Spider-Man: Friend or Foe – The Computer
 Star Wars: Droid Works – Holocam-E / "Cammy"
 The Hobbit – Additional Voices
 The Thing – Computer
 The Wolf Among Us – Bloody Mary
 Titan Quest: Immortal Throne – Oracle
 True Crime: New York City - Additional voices
 Vampire: The Masquerade – Bloodlines – Additional voices
 Van Helsing – Aleera (archive footage)
 X-Men Legends – Debra Owens, Computer Voice #1

Other
 A Bug's Life – Narrator (Disney's Storyteller series)
 Alice in Wonderland attractions – Alice
 Disney on Ice – Jessie
 Disney Live – Jessie
 ESPN (Pardon the Interruption, World Series of Poker, NFL Draft)
 Peter Pan attractions – Wendy Darling
 The Haunted Mansion – The Bride
 The Twilight Zone Tower of Terror – Little Girl Lost
 Toy Story Midway Mania! – Jessie

References

External links
 
 Speakers Bureau website
 
 

Living people
American film actresses
American television actresses
American video game actresses
American voice actresses
Audiobook narrators
20th-century American actresses
21st-century American actresses
Year of birth missing (living people)